Thomas Andrew Knowles (born 27 September 1998) is an English professional footballer who plays as a midfielder and forward for League Two club Walsall.

Having started his career at his hometown club Cambridge United, he has previously played on loan at St Neots Town, Cambridge City, St Ives Town, Hemel Hempstead Town and Kettering Town.

Career

Cambridge United
Knowles graduated through the Cambridge United Shadow Scholars Academy to win a place in the club's youth-team in 2016. He was a part of the under-18 team that reached the fourth round of the FA Youth Cup in the 2016–17 season. On 4 February 2017, he joined Southern League Premier Division side St Neots Town on a one-month loan deal, along with "U's" teammate Fernando Bell-Toxtle. He made 12 appearances for the "Saints". He signed a six-month development contract with United at the end of the 2016–17 season, with Academy manager Mark Bonner commenting that Knowles had "taken ownership for his development and shown a willingness to learn and improve".
On 3 August 2017, he joined Southern League Division One Central club Cambridge City on an initial one-month loan deal. He scored a hat-trick for the club in a 7–3 win over Arlesey Town on 23 October. Having scored ten goals in 28 appearances for the "Lilywhites", he was recalled by United manager Shaun Derry in order to sit on the bench in a league fixture against Notts County.

On 8 January 2018, he joined St Ives Town of the Southern League Premier Central on an initial 28-day youth loan. He signed a one-year contract extension with United the following month. He was recalled to Cambridge United by new manager Joe Dunne on 20 April after picking up several Man of the Match awards and scoring four goals during his 16 appearances for the "Saints". He made his first-team debut on the final day of the 2017–18 season, coming on as a 72nd-minute substitute for David Amoo in a 5–0 victory over Port Vale at the Abbey Stadium on 5 May.

On 31 August 2018, Knowles joined Dartford on an initial month's loan. After returning to Cambridge United later that season he scored his first goal for them in a 2-1 defeat to Morecambe on 27 April 2019.

He was offered a new contract by Cambridge United at the end of the 2018–19 season.

On 17 October 2019, Knowles signed for Chelmsford City on an initial one-month loan. On 3 March 2020, after previously having his loan deal extended until the end of the season, Knowles was recalled by Cambridge.

Yeovil Town
On 30 November 2020, Knowles joined National League side Yeovil Town for an undisclosed fee signing a contract until the end of the 2021–22 season.

Walsall
On 4 August 2022, Knowles signed for League Two side Walsall for an undisclosed fee.

Career statistics

References

1998 births
Living people
Sportspeople from Cambridge
English footballers
Association football forwards
Association football midfielders
Newmarket Town F.C. players
Cambridge United F.C. players
St Neots Town F.C. players
Cambridge City F.C. players
St Ives Town F.C. players
Dartford F.C. players
Hemel Hempstead Town F.C. players
Kettering Town F.C. players
Royston Town F.C. players
Chelmsford City F.C. players
Yeovil Town F.C. players
Walsall F.C. players
Southern Football League players
English Football League players
National League (English football) players